Scrobipalpa latiuncella is a moth in the family Gelechiidae. It was described by Oleksiy V. Bidzilya and Hou-Hun Li in 2010. It is found in Ningxia, China.

The forewings are covered with light-grey black-tipped scales concentrated mainly along the costal margin. There is a black spot at two-thirds near the dorsal margin and a small black spot at the base of the cell and a prolonged black spot at the corner of the cell. There are ochreous scales along veins, mainly in the basal half. The hindwings are grey. Adults are on wing in early June.

Etymology
The species name refers to the broad uncus in the male genitalia and is derived from Latin latus (meaning broad).

References

Scrobipalpa
Moths described in 2010